Keeping up with the Bigheads / Skid Marks
 Keeping up with the Eds
 Keeping up with the Joneses (disambiguation)
 Keeping Up with the Johnsons
 Keeping Up With Our Joneses
 Keeping Up with the Kalashnikovs
 Keeping Up with the Kandasamys
 Keeping Up with the Kardashians
 Keeping Up with Lizzie
 Keeping Up with the Steins